is a UK labour law case, concerning the information and consultation in the European Union.

Facts 
In 2009 to deal with a budget deficit, the University of Stirling proposed 140 redundancies. Under TULRCA 1992 section 188, it consulted with UCU but did not do so for employees on limited term contracts, which ended in the consultation period. UCU claimed they should be included and were dismissed as redundant.

The Tribunal held the employees were dismissed as redundant in three cases, but not a fourth. The EAT held all four were dismissed, but none as redundant. The Inner House agreed.

Judgment
Baroness Hale held that the employees were dismissed as redundant. Expiry was a dismissal. And second, the dismissal was ‘for a reason not related to the individual concerned’ under TULRCA 1992 s 195(1). The fact that a person entered a contract for a limited could not mean that expiry was for a reason related to the individual. Parliament never intended to narrow the scope of consultation duties.

Lord Wilson, Lord Sumption, Lord Reed and Lord Hughes agreed.

See also

UK labour law
Codetermination

Notes

References

United Kingdom labour case law
2015 in case law
2015 in British law
Supreme Court of the United Kingdom cases